Marcus Weiss (born 1961 in Basel, Switzerland) is a saxophonist and teacher. His repertoire includes all epochs, from the beginnings in impressionistic France to the present.

As a soloist, Weiss worked with many European orchestras and ensembles of contemporary music. He has been invited to major festivals in Europe, the US and Asia. As a chamber musician, Weiss is primarily working with his two ensembles, Trio Accanto (Nicolas Hodges, piano and Christian Dierstein percussion) and Quatuor Xasax in Paris (with saxophonists Serge Bertocchi, Jean-Michel Goury and Pierre-Stéphane Meugé.

Since 1995 he has taught saxophone and chamber music at the Hochschule für Musik Basel, where he also directs a Masters program for contemporary music. He is regularly giving masterclasses at various international universities (London, Madrid, Berlin, Vienna, Moscow, Amsterdam, Bordeaux, Palma, Porto, Boston, New York, Chicago, Takefu, Sevilla.). Weiss is a regular teacher at the "Darmstaedter Ferienkurse fuer neue Musik“  as well as at IMPULS (ensemble academy) in Graz, Austria.

He studied saxophone with Iwan Roth at the Hochschule für Musik Basel and Frederick L. Hemke at Northwestern University in Evanston, Illinois. In 1989, he was awarded the soloist’s prize of the Swiss Tonkuenstlerverein.

Weiss is a d'Addario artist

World premieres

Solo 
 Mark Andre ''iv 12'' (2013) 
 Georges Aperghis ''Alter Ego'' (2001)
 Alex Buess  ''Audio-Konstrukt Arch. II'' (1989) 
 Gérard Buquet ''L’astre échevelée'' (2009)
 Shigeru Kan-no ''Work'' (1995)
 Valentin Marti ''Charon'' ( 2007)  
 Giorgio Netti ''Necessità d'interrogare il cielo'' (1995–98) 
 Giorgio Netti ''Ultimo a lato'' (2005)  
 Mauricio Sotelo "Argos" (1997) 
 Mauricio Sotelo ''Muros de dolor'' (2005)  
 Karlheinz Stockhausen ''Edentia'' (2007)

Solo with ensemble/orchestra 
 Georg Friedrich Haas ''Baritonsaxophonkonzert'' (2008) b.sax and orch   
 Jürg Birkenkoetter ''Tripelkonzert'' (2002/03) sax, pno, perc and orch 
 Manuel Hidalgo ''Romance de Le Châtelier'' (1994) sax (a/b) and ens 
 Toshio Hosokawa ''Herbst Wanderer'' (2005) s.sax, pno, perc and strings   
 Hanspeter Kyburz ''Cells'' (1993/94) sax (SATB) and ens   
 Roland Moser ''Wal'' (1980/83) five sax and orch 
 Salvatore Sciarrino ''Graffito sul Mare'' (2003) s.sax, pno, perc and orch 
 Mauricio Sotelo ''Wall of light Black'' (2003/06) sax and ens 
 Johannes Maria Staud ''Violent Incidents'' (2005) sax (s/t), wind orch and perc

Chamber music 
 Peter Ablinger ''Verkündigung'' (1990) t.sax., fl, pno 
 Mark Andre: ''durch'' (2005/06) s.sax., perc and pno 
 Georges Aperghis: ''Crosswind''  (1997) viola and satb 
 Georges Aperghis ''Funambule'' (2014) a.sax, pno and perc 
 Georges Aperghis ''Zeugen'' (2007) musical theatre 
 Alex Buess ''Hyperbaton'' (1991) ttbb 
 John Cage ''Five 4'' (1991) s.sax, a.sax and 3 perc  
 Alvaro Carlevaro ''Quiebros'' (1993/94)  satb 
 Aldo Clementi ''Tre Ricercari'' (2000) sax, pno perc  
 Stefano Gervasoni ''Rigirio'' (2000) b.sax, pno and perc 
 Vinko Globokar ''Terres brulées, ensuite...'' (1998) sax, pno and perc 
 Wolfgang Heiniger ''Lamento III'' (2003) kb.sax, per and self playing drums 
 Wolfgang Heiniger ''"Desafinado"'' (2005) s.sax, self playing drum and tape 
 Toshio Hosokawa ''Vertical Time Study II'' (1994) t.sax, pno and perc  
 York Hoeller ''Trias'' (2001) s.sax, pno, perc 
 Rudolf Kelterborn ''Musik in vier Sätzen'' (2014/15) viola and satb 
 Thomas Kessler ''Is it?'' (2002) soprano and s.sax 
 Jo Kondo ''A Shrub'' (2000) a.sax, pno and marimba  
 Helmut Lachenmann Sakura (2000) a.sax, pno, perc 
 Bernhard Lang ''Song Book'' (2004) voice, sax, pno, perc 
 Fabien Lévy ''Towards the door we never opened'' (2012) satb 
 Thomas Müller ''Secco'' (1993) sax, pno, perc 
 Giorgio Netti ''avvicinamento'' (1998) satb 
 Giorgio Netti ''due lune pù in là'' (2001) cl, sax, vcl, pno and perc 
 Brice Pauset ''Adagio dialettico'' (2000) s.sax, pno and perc 
 Stefan Prins  ''Mirror Box (Flesh+Prosthesis #3)'' (2014) sax, pno, perc and electr
 Wolfgang Rihm ''Gegenstück'' (2006) kb.sax, pno and perc 
 Yuval Shaked ''40malige Gegenwart und Rueckmeldung'' (1998) sax, pno, per  
 Karlheinz Stockhausen ''Erwachen'' (2007) s.sax, trp and vlc 
 Hans Thomalla ''Fracking'' (2013) a.sax and string trio 
 Hans Thomalla ''Lied'' (2017/8) t.sax, pno, perc 
 Manos Tsangaris ''3 Orte'' (1998) sax, pno, perc 
 Walter Zimmermann ''The Paradoxes of Love'' (1987) soprano and s.sax

Publications 
 The Techniques of Saxophone Playing (2010) published by Bärenreiter

Recordings 
 Georges Aperghis "works for saxophone and viola“ (0012942KAI, Kairos/Vienna)
 Karlheinz Stockhausen "Edentia“ (Stockhausen Verlag CD 98)
 Marcus Weiss "Swiss contemporary music for saxophone“ (MGB CTS-M 86)
 So near so far  - Trio Accanto  (edition zeitklang)
 Vykintas Baltakas (KAIROS/Vienna, 0015004KAI)
 J.M.Staud Portrait   (KAIROS/Vienna (0012672KAI, Vienna)
 Sciarrino "Pagine“ Xasax  (ZIG-ZAG TERRITORIES PARIS, ZZT 031001)
 Mauricio Sotelo with Musik-Fabrik (0012832KAI, Kairos/Vienna)
 Giorgio Netti "necessita d’interrogare il cielo“ (DURIAN Vienna, 020-2, LC 02520)
 Trio Accanto (assai, 222502 – MU750)
 Mark Andre (12732KAI, Kairos/Vienna)
 Elena Mendoza (0012882KAI, Kairos/Vienna)
 CONQUEST OF MELODY hat(now)ART CD 6178 (1997)
 ARS SUBTILIOR  Xasax  hat(now)ART 107 (1998)
 KYA Music by Giacinto Scelsi  hat(now)ART 117 (1999) 
 Counterpoise Xasax and Trio Accanto  hat(now)ART 136 (2000) 
 XASAX  EROL Records 7019 (1994)
 Alfred Zimmerlin  (Musiques suisses, MGB CTS-M 115)
 Hanspeter Kyburz Klangforum MGB CTS-M 52 (1997)
 Neue Musik für Saxophon  XOPF Records 10  (1991)
 Detlev Müller-Siemens  WERGO, WER 6648 2 (1999)
 MUSIKFABRIK NRW
 "Traum“ by Gerhard Staebler CPO 999 259 2 (1994)
 Nikolaus A. Huber  BVHAAST CD 9407 (1994)

References

External links 
 Official website

1961 births
Living people
Swiss saxophonists
Male saxophonists
Northwestern University faculty
21st-century saxophonists
21st-century male musicians